Lauterbachia is a monotypic genus of flowering plants belonging to the family Monimiaceae. The only species is Lauterbachia novoguineensis .

It is native to New Guinea.

The genus name of Lauterbachia is in honour of Carl Adolf Georg Lauterbach (1864–1937), a German explorer and botanist. The Latin specific epithet of novoguineensis means from New Guinea (where the plant was found).
Both genus and species were first described and published in K.M.Schumann & C.A.G.Lauterbach, Fl. Schutzgeb. Südsee on pages 330-331 in 1900.

References

Monimiaceae
Monimiaceae genera
Monotypic Laurales genera
Plants described in 1900
Flora of New Guinea